Brimeura amethystina, the amethyst hyacinth, is a flowering plant of the asparagus family Asparagaceae, native to the Northern Pyrenees and north east Spain. The record from the Kapela mountain (Croatia) by Reichenbach (1830) is probably a confusion with some Hyacinthella taxon growing in the Balkan area.

There is also a white cultivar ‘Alba’. It was formerly placed in the hyacinth genus Hyacinthus.

The Latin specific epithet amethystina means “violet coloured”.

In cultivation in the UK this plant has gained the Royal Horticultural Society’s Award of Garden Merit.

References

Gallery

Scilloideae